43rd Anti-Aircraft Brigade was an air defence formation of Britain's Territorial Army (TA). Formed in 1938, it was responsible for protecting Teesside in North East England during the early part of the Second World War, and later defended South East England from V-1 flying bombs. It was reformed postwar and survived under different titles until 1961.

Mobilisation
With the expansion of Britain's Anti-Aircraft (AA) defences in the late 1930s, new formations were created to command the growing number of Royal Artillery (RA) and Royal Engineers (RE) AA gun and searchlight units 43rd AA Brigade was raised on 1 October 1938 at West Hartlepool and comprised part-time TA units from Teesside and County Durham. Initially, it formed part of 3rd AA Division, which had responsibility for defending Scotland, Northern Ireland and North East England. The first brigade commander was Brigadier K.D. Yearsley, MC.

At the time the brigade was formed, the TA's AA units were in a state of mobilisation because of the Munich crisis, although they were soon stood down. In February 1939 the TA's AA defences came under the control of a new Anti-Aircraft Command. In June a partial mobilisation of AA Command was begun in a process known as 'couverture', whereby each unit did a month's tour of duty in rotation to man selected AA gun and searchlight positions. That summer, 43rd AA Bde came under the command of the newly formed 7th AA Division, which was created to cover North East England, Yorkshire and Humberside. Its exact responsibilities were still being worked out when war broke out. AA Command mobilised fully on 24 August, ahead of the official declaration of war on 3 September.

Order of Battle 1939
The composition of the brigade upon mobilisation in August 1939 was as follows:
 85th (Tees) AA Regiment, RA – new Heavy AA unit formed in 1938
 HQ at Middlesbrough
 174th (1st North Riding) AA Battery – transferred from 62nd (Northumbrian) AA Regiment at Middlesbrough
 175th (2nd North Riding) AA Battery – transferred from 62nd AA Regiment at Middlesbrough
 220th (County Durham) AA Battery – transferred from 63rd (Northumbrian) AA Regiment at West Hartlepool
 47th (The Durham Light Infantry) AA Battalion, RE – Searchlight unit converted from 7th Battalion, Durham Light Infantry
 HQ, 386th–388th AA Companies at Sunderland
 389th AA Company at South Shields
 1/5th Battalion, Durham Light Infantry (54th Searchlight Regiment) – Searchlight unit converted from 5th Battalion, Durham Light Infantry
 HQ, 411th–413th Searchlight Batteries at Stockton-on-Tees
 2/5th Battalion, Durham Light Infantry (55th Searchlight Regiment) – duplicate unit formed in April 1939
 HQ, 414th–416th Searchlight Batteries  at West Hartlepool
 43rd Anti-Aircraft Brigade Company, Royal Army Service Corps

Phoney War
Equipment was critically short at the outbreak of war. In August 1939, 7 AA Division only had 14 3-inch or 3.7-inch Heavy AA guns deployed on Teesside. Luckily, the months of the Phoney War that followed mobilisation allowed AA Command to address its equipment shortages and a Gun Defence Area (GDA) was established around Teesside including Middlesbrough and Billingham. Vital Points (VPs) such as RAF Fighter Command airfields and factories began to receive a few Bofors LAA guns.

85th AA Regiment left the brigade in November 1939 to mobilise for overseas service; in April 1940 it joined the British Expeditionary Force in France. Later, 54th S/L Regiment transferred to 31st (North Midland) Anti-Aircraft Brigade covering West Yorkshire.

Battle of Britain
After the Fall of France and the BEF's evacuation from Dunkirk, returning AA units were re-equipped and re-integrated into AA Command as quickly as possible. By the summer of 1940, all TA searchlight regiments had been transferred to the Royal Artillery (RA), and AA regiments had been redesignated Heavy Anti-Aircraft (HAA) to distinguish them from the new Light Anti-Aircraft (LAA) regiments being formed.

Teesside and Wearside were important strategic targets because of their concentrations of heavy industry and ports. During the early part of the Battle of Britain, German day and night air raids and mine laying began along the East Coast of England, intensifying through June 1940. Thereafter the Luftwaffe concentrated on Royal Air Force sites in the South of England, with occasional raids on the North East, such as the period 12–15 August.

On 15 August, in the belief that the defences of NE England had been denuded, Luftflotte 5 attacked across the North Sea from Norway. Some 65 Heinkel He 111 bombers of Kampfgeschwader 26 escorted by 35 Messerschmitt Bf 110 Zerstörer fighters of Zerstörergeschwader 76 were picked up on radar and ambushed by fighters of No. 13 Group RAF before they reached the coast. Those bombers that succeeded in breaking through then split into two groups, one being engaged by the guns of the Tyne GDA the other by the Tees GDA. Bombs were widely scattered and only at Sunderland was any major damage inflicted. KG 26 lost 8 bombers and 7 fighters for no loss to the RAF, in 'one of the most successful air actions of the war'.

The Blitz
After the defeat of the Battle of Britain, the Luftwaffe switched to night raids over Britain's cities (The Blitz) during the winter of 1940–41. By 21 August, the Teesside GDA contained 30 HAA guns, and as more LAA units became available they were distributed to defend VPs. AA 'Z' Regiments were also formed, equipped with Z Battery rocket projectiles.

The cluster system was an attempt to improve the chances of picking up enemy bombers and keeping them illuminated for engagement by AA guns or RAF Night fighters. Eventually, one light in each cluster was to be equipped with searchlight control (SLC or 'Elsie') radar and act as 'master light', but the radar equipment was still in short supply. The number of raiders shot down steadily increased until mid-May 1941, when the Luftwaffe scaled down its attacks.

Order of Battle 1940–41

By now AA Command had been greatly expanded and reorganised. The order of battle of 43 AA Bde was now as follows (temporary attachments omitted):

 8th (Belfast) HAA Rgt – returned from Dunkirk and re-equipped
 21, 22, 23, 414 HAA Btys
 59th (Essex Regiment) HAA Rgt – from 6 AA Division Summer 1941
 164, 167, 265, 429 HAA Btys
 73rd HAA Rgt – returned from Dunkirk and re-equipped; to 12 AA Division May 1941
 209, 210, 311 HAA Btys
 126th HAA Rgt – new regiment formed July 1941
 423, 425, 426 HAA Btys
 50th LAA Rgt – new unit raised in July 1940 from a battery of 14th (West Lothian, Royal Scots) LAA Rgt plus recruits
 58, 93 LAA Btys
 178 LAA Bty – left July 1941
 72nd LAA Rgt – new LAA unit raised in January 1941; to 3 AA Division Summer 1941
 212, 213, 217 LAA Btys
 47th (Durham Light Infantry) S/L Rgt
 386, 387, 388, 389 S/L Btys
 55th (Durham Light Infantry) S/L Rgt
 414, 415, 416, 530 S/L Btys
 3 AA 'Z' Rgt – from 3 AA Division Summer 1941
 103, 107, 115, 118 Z Btys
 11 AA 'Z' Rgt – from 12 AA Division Summer 1941
 134, 147, 148 Z Btys

Mid-war
During 1942 the Luftwaffe switched to 'hit and run' attacks against coastal targets. One notable example was the bombing of Middlesbrough railway station by a lone Dornier bomber on August Bank Holiday (3 August).

As the war progressed, AA units began to be sent to overseas theatres. 8th (Belfast) HAA Rgt was posted to GHQ Reserve in November 1941 preparatory to embarking for India. In January 1942, 47th and 55th (DLI) S/L Rgts were converted to the LAA role and became 112th and 113th (DLI) LAA Rgts respectively. Both regiments later served under 21st Army Group in North West Europe. 73rd HAA Rgt was sent to Middle East Forces (MEF) by April 1942.  and 72nd LAA Rgt was in Tunisia by July 1943.

This continual turnover of units accelerated with the need to transfer LAA units to counter the hit-and-run attacks and preparations for the invasion of North Africa (Operation Torch) in late 1942. However, newly formed units continued to join AA Command, the HAA and support units increasingly becoming 'Mixed' units, indicating that women of the Auxiliary Territorial Service (ATS) were fully integrated into them.

At the end of 1941 this turnover meant that 43 AA Bde consisted only of one new HAA regiment (123rd), one new LAA regiment (41st), and one S/L regiment (53rd (Royal Northumberland Fusiliers)).

Order of Battle 1941–42
During this period the brigade had the following composition (temporary attachments omitted):
 123rd HAA Rgt
 402, 404, 414, 417 HAA Btys
 126th HAA Rgt – returned August 1942
 423, 425, 426, 431 HAA Btys
 145th (Mixed) HAA Rgt – new unit raised in January, joined April 1942
 500, 501, 502 (M) HAA Btys
 572 (M) HAA Bty – joined June 1942; to 158th (Mixed) HAA Rgt summer 1942
 31st LAA Rgt – from Orkney and Shetland Defences (OSDEF) June 1942; left for 6th AA Division June 1942
 61, 101, 224, 447 LAA Btys

 41st LAA Rgt – to War Office Control April 1942 preparatory to embarking for MEF
 133, 134, 143 LAA Btys
 68th LAA Rgt – from 30 AA Bde by May 1942; unbrigaded from June 1942; later joined 59th (Staffordshire) Infantry Division 
 203, 204, 278, 461 LAA Btys
 136th LAA Rgt – new unit raised in February 1942; joined June 1942
 386, 453, 474, 482 LAA Btys
 53rd (RNF) S/L Rgt – to 30 AA Bde August 1942
 408, 409, 410, 565 S/L Btys
 7 AA 'Z' Rgt – from 30 AA Bde by May 1942
 106, 109, 110, 117 Z Btys
 43 AA Brigade Signal Office Mixed Subsection – part of 2 Company, 7 AA Division Mixed Signal Unit, Royal Corps of Signals (RCS)

Later war
In October 1942 AA Command reorganised its structure, replacing the AA Divisions with AA Groups coinciding with RAF Fighter Command's Groups. 43 AA Bde came under 6 AA Group, covering Scotland and North-East England.

By late 1943 AA Command was being forced to make manpower cuts, releasing men to 21st Army Group for Operation Overlord, the planned Allied invasion of Normandy, and a number of batteries were disbanded.

Order of Battle 1942–44
During this period the composition of the brigade was as follows:
 123rd HAA Rgt – to East Africa Command November 1942
 402, 402, 404, 417 HAA Btys
 126th HAA Rgt – to 7 AA Group November 1942
 423, 425, 426, 431 HAA Btys
 129th (M) HAA Rgt – from 36 (Scottish) AA Bde April 1943
 444, 445, 454, 455 (M) HAA Btys
 145th (M) HAA Rgt – to 36 AA Bde April 1943
 500, 501, 502, 531 (M) HAA Btys
 136th LAA Rgt
 386, 453, 474 LAA Btys
 482 LAA Bty – left November 1943
 7 AA 'Z' Rgt – became Mixed February 1943; redesignated 7 AA Area Mixed Rgt April 1944 
 106, 117 Z Btys
 109, 110 Z Btys – left by March 1944
 226, 229 Z Btys – joined February 1943
 43 AA Brigade Mixed Signal Office Section – part of 2 Company, 6 AA Group Mixed Signal Unit, RCS

Operation Diver
In March 1944, 6 AA Group HQ was transferred to Southern England to assist 2 AA Group by taking over some of the responsibility for defending the assembly camps, depots and embarkation ports for Operation Overlord, and planning for the expected onslaught of V-1 flying bombs (codenamed 'Divers'). 5 AA Group assumed responsibility for NE England, including 43 AA Bde.

The first V-1 missiles were fired against London in June, a week after D-Day, and Operation Diver was activated. 2 AA Group's HAA batteries left their 'Overlord' sites and moved to pre-planned sites across the 'funnel' of V-1 flightpaths. 43 AA Brigade was one of four reinforcing brigade HQs moved into the area within two weeks. However, the initial results were disappointing, and after a fortnight AA Command changed its tactics. Firstly, mobile HAA guns were replaced with static installations that could traverse more quickly to track the fast-moving targets. These were emplaced on temporary 'Pile platforms' named after the Commander-in-Chief of AA Command, Gen Sir Frederick 'Tim' Pile. Secondly, the HAA gun belt was moved to the coast and interlaced with LAA guns to hit the missiles out to sea. This new belt was divided into six brigade sectors, with 43 AA Bde HQ taking charge of one sector, with 183rd (M) HAA and 143rd LAA Rgts under command. The whole process involved the movement of hundreds of guns and vehicles and thousands of servicemen and women, but a new 8-gun site could be established in 48 hours. The guns were constantly in action, but success rate against the 'Divers' steadily improved, until over 50 per cent of incoming missiles were destroyed by gunfire or fighter aircraft. This phase of Operation Diver ended in September after the V-1 launch sites in Northern France had been overrun by 21st Army Group.

Order of Battle 1944–45
From July 1944 the brigade's composition was as follows:
 129th (Mixed) HAA Rgt – rejoined from 5 AA Group August 1944, became non-Mixed August 1945
 444, 445, 454 (M) Btys 
 455 (M) HAA Bty - to 137 (M) HAA Rgt November 1944
 130th (M) HAA Rgt – from 5 AA Group September 1944 442, 443, 448, 449 (M) HAA Btys
 132nd (M) HAA Rgt – from 102 AA Bde October 1944 435, 450, 457, 469 (M) HAA Btys
 134th (M) HAA Rgt – from 40 AA Bde October 1944 459, 460, 461, 583 (M) HAA Btys
 138th HAA Rgt – from 57 AA Bde August; to 5 AA Bde September 1944 419, 424, 437, 438 HAA Btys

 183rd (M) HAA Rgt – to 71 AA Bde August 1944 564, 591, 608, 640 (M) HAA Btys
 188th (M) HAA Rgt – joined October 1944 630, 632, 642 (M) HAA Btys
 189th (M) HAA Rgt – from 3 AA Group October 1944 575, 577 (M) HAA Btys
 95th LAA Rgt – from 102 AA Bde September; left October 1944 297, 302, 460 LAA Btys
 97th LAA Rgt – from 101 AA Bde August; to 1 AA Group October 1944 232, 301, 480 LAA Btys
 135th LAA Rgt – from 102 AA Bde August; to 5 AA Bde September 445, 447, 450 LAA Btys
 143rd LAA Rgt – to 71 AA Bde August 1944 403, 410, 413 LAA Btys
 58th (Middlesex) S/L Rgt – from 5 AA Group September 1944 314, 425, 426 S/L Btys

By October 1944, the brigade's HQ establishment was 11 officers, 10 male other ranks and 28 members of the ATS, together with a small number of attached drivers, cooks and mess orderlies (male and female). In addition, the brigade had a Mixed Signal Office Section of 1 officer, 5 male other ranks and 19 ATS, which was formally part of the Group signal unit.

Disbandment
In October 1944, AA Command began planning to counter the expected attacks by air-launched V-1s coming in across the North Sea against targets on the East Coast and the Midlands. AA units and formations were moved from the South Coast, and 43 AA Brigade HQ was disbanded on 15 November.

Postwar
When the TA was constituted in 1947, 43 AA Bde reformed at Leeds as 69 AA Brigade (TA), once again forming part of 5 AA Group at Nottingham. It now comprised the following units from the West Riding of Yorkshire:AA Bdes 67–102 at British Army 1945 on. Watson, TA 1947.
 466 (Leeds Rifles) (Mixed) HAA RgtLitchfield, p. 266.
 496 (Mixed) HAA RgtLitchfield, p. 267.
 584 (West Yorkshire Regiment) (Mobile) HAA RgtLitchfield, p. 259.
 538 (West Riding) LAA Rgt, converted to LAA/SL in 1949Litchfield, p. 269.
 578 (5th Bn Duke of Wellington's Regiment) SL Rgt, shortly afterwards converted to Mobile HAALitchfield, p. 268.
 69 Fire Control Troop, RA
 37 (Leeds) AA Signal Squadron, Royal Corps of Signals (part of 5 AA Group's 15th (Mixed) Signal Regiment)
('Mixed' indicated that members of the Women's Royal Army Corps were integrated into the unit.)

AA Command was disbanded on 10 March 1955, and there was a considerable reduction in the number of TA AA units. 69 AA Bde was converted into an Army Group Royal Artillery (AGRA) and temporarily designated 'V' AGRA; from 1 August 1955 it became 42 (AA) AGRA at York with the following composition:Frederick, p. 965.Routledge, Table LXXV, p. 442.
 324 (Northumbrian) HAA
 437 LAA Rgt – the former 54th (Durham Light Infantry) S/L Rgt, see above 438 LAA RgtLitchfield, p. 139.
 463 LAA/SL Rgt
 466 (Leeds Rifles) LAA Rgt – converted from HAA, see above 42 AGRA (AA) Signal Squadron, RCS – formed at Leeds, probably from 37 AA Signal Sqn, see aboveIn 1959, 42 AGRA Signals was renumbered 308 Signal Squadron. When the AGRA was disbanded, this unit transferred to become 308 Signal Sqn (Guards Brigade).

42 (AA) AGRA was disbanded on 1 May 1961.

Footnotes

Notes

References
 Basil Collier, History of the Second World War, United Kingdom Military Series: The Defence of the United Kingdom, London: HM Stationery Office, 1957.
 Richard Collier, Eagle Day: The Battle of Britain, August 6–September 15, 1940, London: Hodder & Stoughton, 1966/Pan Books, 1968, . 
 Gen Sir Martin Farndale, History of the Royal Regiment of Artillery: The Years of Defeat: Europe and North Africa, 1939–1941, Woolwich: Royal Artillery Institution, 1988/London: Brasseys, 1996, .
 J.B.M. Frederick, Lineage Book of British Land Forces 1660–1978, Vol II, Wakefield, Microform Academic, 1984, .
 
 Norman E.H. Litchfield, The Territorial Artillery 1908–1988 (Their Lineage, Uniforms and Badges), Nottingham: Sherwood Press, 1992, .
 Cliff Lord & Graham Watson, Royal Corps of Signals: Unit Histories of the Corps (1920–2001) and its Antecedents, Solihull: Helion, 2003, .
 Gen Sir Frederick Pile's despatch: "The Anti-Aircraft Defence of the United Kingdom from 28th July, 1939, to 15th April, 1945" London Gazette 18 December 1947
 Brig N.W. Routledge, History of the Royal Regiment of Artillery: Anti-Aircraft Artillery 1914–55'', London: Royal Artillery Institution/Brassey's, 1994, .

External sources
 The Royal Artillery 1939–45
 British Military History
 Orders of Battle at Patriot Files
 British Army units from 1945 on
 Graham Watson, The Territorial Army 1947

Military units and formations established in 1938
Air defence brigades of the British Army
Anti-Aircraft brigades of the British Army in World War II
Military units and formations in County Durham
Military units and formations disestablished in 1961